Amani is a former municipality on the island of Chios, North Aegean, Greece. Since the 2011 local government reform it is part of the municipality Chios, of which it is a municipal unit. It is located in the northwestern part of the island, and has a land area of 158.392 km². Its population was 983 at the 2011 census. The seat of the municipality was in Volissos (pop. 313). Its next largest town is Parpariá (138).

References

External links
Official website 

Populated places in Chios

bg:Амани (дем)